Sögen Island is an island forming the east side of Francais Cove, lying in the southwest extremity of Port Charcot, which indents the north part of Booth Island, in the Wilhelm Archipelago. Discovered by the French Antarctic Expedition, 1903–05, under Charcot, and named for one of the dogs which died and was buried here. The name has been approved because of its long use.

See also 
 List of Antarctic and sub-Antarctic islands

Islands of the Wilhelm Archipelago